The Women's Antifascist Front (Антифашистички фронт жена, abbreviated AFŽ/AФЖ;), was a Yugoslav feminist and anti-fascist mass organisation. The predecessor to several feminist front groups in the former Yugoslavia, and present-day organisations in the region, the AFŽ was heavily involved in organising and participating in the Partisans, the communist and multi-ethnic resistance to Nazi occupation of Yugoslavia during World War II.

It was formed by volunteers on 6 December 1942 in Bosanski Petrovac at the First National Conference of Women.

Name
In its early days, the organization was called Antifascist Organization of Women (AOZ). In Croatia, the organization was named the Antifascist front of women of Croatia. In Slovenia there were a number of titles: Antifascist women association, Antifascist Front Women, Antifascist Front of Women. It was founded under the name of Slovenian Antifascist Women Association. There was also a Slovenian Anti-Italian Women's Union. In Macedonia, it was called  Antifascist front of women of Macedonia (Antifašistički front na ženite na Makedonija). In Serbia there was the Antifascist Front of Women of Serbia, including the Antifascist Front of Women of Vojvodina (based in Subotica).

Establishment and reasons for establishing

Before World War II, many women organizations advocated for peace, fighting against the different totalitarian forces that were growing across Europe. During the war however, many women organized themselves within the antifascist movement, and strengthened its position. This is confirmed by the first document of the Supreme Headquarters and the National Liberation Army volunteer Yugoslavia, which at that time was the supreme authority in the liberated territories. In various documents it confirmed women's active and passive voting rights, which they already possessed prior to 1941, as outlined in the Constitution, but were not allowed to exercise.

years Rabia during elections for national liberation committees as the new authorities. Women began to massively involve the NOP as soldiers, medical staff, politicians and MPs.

Different female structures, which were established in 1941 under various names, have been associated in the wider areas, and as of 6 December 1942, held the first National Conference of Women. At the conference attended by 166 delegates from all over Yugoslavia, except for Macedonia, because they did not occur because of both distance and security concerns. Then the Conference founded Antifascist Front of Women with the aim of mobilizing women for assisting new units, helping partisan government bodies, participation in armed and sabotage actions, and for the development of 'Brotherhood and Unity' among women.

These groups were decentralized into what would later become the constituent republics of the Socialist Federal Republic of Yugoslavia:

Women's Antifascist Front of Bosnia and Herzegovina
Women's Antifascist Front of Croatia
Women's Antifascist Front of Kosovo
Women's Antifascist Front of Macedonia
Women's Antifascist Front of Montenegro
Women's Antifascist Front of Serbia
Women's Antifascist Front of Slovenia
Women's Antifascist Front of Vojvodina

World War II
AFŽ played an influential role in the Second World War, after the Invasion of Yugoslavia. The NLA attracted about two million women. In military units, there were 110 000 women. During the war, 2,000 women became officers. AFŽ Committees were also responsible were collecting clothes for the NOV, cared about children, wounded soldiers, worked as front line nurses and perform agricultural tasks.

Losses
Of the 305,000 fallen soldiers between 1941-1945, 25,000 were women, and of the 405,000 injured 40,000 were women.

After the War
The issue of legal equality did not arise, because the women through their participation in the national liberation movement had arguably already achieved certain rights. All that after FOCA regulations on the principles of equality enshrined in the later constitutions "new" Yugoslavia, and various laws, the result of the struggle of women themselves in the feminist and anti-fascist women's organizations before the war, as well as their struggle during the war. AFŽ acted to eliminate the consequences of the war, the promotion of education, the construction of new residential buildings, cultural work and others. In particular, it was the education of the girls, and opposition to discrimination and segregation of women.

Abolition
Antifascist Front of Women was abolished at its Fourth Congress (26 - 28 September 1953) in Belgrade, when the decision on the name WAS changed to The Women's societies of Yugoslavia, and access to the Socialist Alliance of Working People of Yugoslavia. Front was upbraided "superfluous political activities". Instead AFŽ in the Socialist Republic of Croatia acted Croatian Union of Women Societies (Union of Women Croatian), later conference for social position of women and the family within the Republican conference SSRNH (Conference for Social Activity of Women Croatian). There was a Committee for social position of women and the family which actually keeps. In her work The Yugoslav Antifascist Front of Women (AFŽ): Legacy, Lessons and Some Insights, Andrea Jovanović explores the question of the legacy of the AFŽ and attempts to explain how and why the AFŽ legacy disappeared in the post-Yugoslav period.

External links 
 AFŽ Arhiv - Archive of antifascist struggle of women of Bosnia and Herzegovina and Yugoslavia

References 

Paramilitary organizations based in Yugoslavia